Seward Lincoln "Suey" Mains Sr. (March 31, 1865 – February 9, 1934) was an American football player and coach.  

Mains was born in Danville, Iowa, in 1865. He attended Doane College in Crete, Nebraska, where he played college football. He played in Doane's first college football game, earned a reputation as "a great general in the field", and missed only two games in the first five years of Doane football. He was also the captain of the Doane football team for two seasons. He scored a touchdown in Doane's 12-0 victory over the 1894 Nebraska football team. He graduated from Doane in 1895. He was also the school's champion in the shot put and hammer throw.

Mains was the sixth head football coach at Doane, serving for two seasons, from 1899 to 1900, and compiling a record of 4–2.

In October 1893, Mains was married to Laura Patton of Ashland, Nebraska. At that time, he was employed in real estate in Crete.  He later operated a confectionery store in Crete, Nebraska, and was employed by the Bankers Life Insurance Company for more than 25 years. He died from a heart attack in 1934 at Lincoln, Nebraska.

Head coaching record

Notes

 Also given as Lincoln Seward Mains in some sources

References

External links
 

1865 births
1934 deaths
19th-century players of American football
Doane Tigers football coaches
Doane Tigers football players
People from Des Moines County, Iowa
People from Crete, Nebraska